Asyan (also Romanized as Āsyān, Āsīān, and Asīyan) is a village in Abgarm Rural District, Abgarm District, Avaj County, Qazvin Province, Iran. In the 2006 census, its population was 290.

References 

Populated places in Avaj County